Kroll is an American corporate investigation and risk consulting firm established in 1972 and based in New York City. In 2018, Kroll was acquired by Duff & Phelps. In 2021, Duff & Phelps decided to rebrand itself as Kroll, a process it completed in 2022.

History
Kroll was founded in 1972 by Jules Kroll as a consultancy servicing corporate purchasing departments.

Kroll began its line of work in financial sector investigations in the 1980s when corporations approached Kroll to profile investors, suitors, and takeover targets.

In the 1990s, Kroll expanded into forensic accounting, background screening, drug testing, electronic data recovery, and market intelligence.

In 1997, Kroll merged with vehicle armoring company O'Gara-Hess & Eisenhardt to form Kroll-O'Gara. The company became public and was listed on the NASDAQ as "KROG". In August 2001, the O’Gara vehicle armoring businesses were sold to Armor Holdings, and the company's name was changed to Kroll Inc. and its ticker symbol to "KROL".

In 2002, Kroll acquired restructuring firm Zolfo Cooper for $153 million. At the time, Zolfo Cooper was working on the Enron case.

In July 2004, Kroll was acquired by professional services firm Marsh & McLennan Companies in a $1.9-billion transaction.

In June 2008, Jules Kroll left Kroll Inc.

In August 2010, Kroll was acquired by Altegrity, Inc. in an all-cash transaction valued at $1.13 billion. Altegrity declared bankruptcy in 2015, and Kroll was later bought by Corporate Risk Holdings, LLC.

On October 21, 2016, Carlyle Group-owned LDiscovery purchased Kroll Ontrack for around $410 million and operated it as a separate company. In 2018, Kroll acquired cybersecurity firm Tiversa.

On June 4, 2018, Duff & Phelps purchased Kroll Inc. In February 2021, Duff & Phelps announced plans to unify the companies under the Kroll brand, which completed in February 2022.

On March 25, 2021, Kroll announced that it had acquired Redscan, a UK based cyber security company. In March 2022, Kroll acquired Canadian risk intelligence software company Resolver.

Services

Background screening
Kroll's background screening division provides screening services for areas such as employment, supplier selection, investment placement and institutional admissions. Kroll's Background Screening division also includes the Kroll Fraud Solutions unit, which specializes in identity theft protection and identity restoration services.

Security consulting
Kroll offers consulting services through Kroll Security Group, its Security Consulting and Security Engineering & Design division.

In 2020, Kroll was hired by the Austin Police Department to evaluate the department's policies and protocols for racism and discrimination. They presented their findings to the Austin city council in March 2021.

Social media
Kroll's business and investigations practice provides background checks on Instagram influencers, using publicly-accessible online information to prevent them being 'cancelled' for problematic or potentially disreputable behaviour (e.g. tweets which includes offensive language or content).

Other work 
An agreement between the government of Ghana and Kroll for the firm to retrieve assets and investigate wrongdoings by previous appointments was subject to two lawsuits in 2020, challenging the constitutionality of the agreement. Both lawsuits were dropped in April 2021.

Kroll was hired in 2018 by Michigan State University during the Larry Nassar case to investigate over 170 sexual assault cases at the university.

Notable cases

The Heroin Trail case
In 1987, in the prominent First Amendment case over The Heroin Trail stories in New York Newsday, attorney Floyd Abrams enlisted Kroll's help to find an eyewitness: "But was it conceivable that we could come up with an eyewitness who could be of help? I called Jules Kroll, the CEO of Kroll Associates, the nation's most acclaimed investigative firm, to ask him if he could inquire, through the extensive range of former law enforcement officials employed by him, whether Karaduman was known to be a drug trafficker in Istanbul." Two weeks into the trial Kroll produced Faraculah Arras, who was prepared to testify he was involved in one of Karaduman's drug deals. "I was stunned," recalled Abrams.

Abrams used Kroll again in 1998 to investigate claims by  CNN's Newsstand documentary that sarin nerve gas had been used in Vietnam in 1970 as part of Operation Tailwind.

The John Fredriksen oil theft case
Kroll assisted in the trial of Norwegian shipping tycoon John Fredriksen at the end of the 1980s.

Brazilian privatization 
Fernando Henrique Cardoso, Daniel Dantas, the company in question, André Esteves, Roberto Mangabeira Unger and Dario Messer signed a schedule agreement to privatize Brazilian state-owned enterprises.

WTC and Sears Tower security
Kroll were responsible for revamping security at the World Trade Center after the 1993 World Trade Center bombing. They also took on responsibility for security at Chicago's Sears Tower following the September 11, 2001 attacks.
Just prior to the September 11 attacks, Kroll Inc., under the guidance of Jerome Hauer, the managing director of their Crisis and Consulting Management Group, hired former FBI special investigator John P. O'Neill, who specialized in the Al-Qaeda network held responsible for the 1993 bombing, to head the security at the WTC complex. O'Neill died in the attacks.

Capital outflows from the Soviet Union and Russia
In March 1992, the Yeltsin government contracted Kroll  to track down large sums of money removed from the Soviet Union prior to the 1991 Soviet coup d'état attempt. On March 15, 1992, following accusations from First Deputy Prime Minister Yegor Timurovich Gaidar of "large-scale privatization by the nomenklatura", the Russian government froze all capital outflows from Russia, and eventually, the assets of the Vneshekonombank.

Despite investigators stating they received very little support from Russian authorities, Kroll determined more than $14 billion (in 1991 real dollars) had been transferred from Switzerland to New York prior to the putsch (mostly in joint-stock companies, such as the Leningrad Association of Joint Ventures), and that another $40 billion plus (in 2014 dollars) had been transferred out of Russia by the Communist Party and other government agencies of the former Soviet Union, through hundreds of illicit transactions. This outflow of capital contributed to severe economic conditions in Russia during Boris Yeltsin’s second term.

2014 Moldovan bank fraud scandal
On 28 January 2015, the National Bank of Moldova hired Kroll to present its findings from Project Tenor involving Ilan Shor's Shor Holding and the 2014 Moldovan bank fraud scandal which was part of the Russian Laundromat.

Harvey Weinstein 
In 2015 Kroll was hired by Harvey Weinstein to wipe evidence of sexual abuse from the electronic devices of Ambra Gutierrez as part of a settlement he reached with her. Weinstein had frequent interactions with Kroll especially when trying to find discrediting information about potential critics and accusers.

References

Sources

External links
 

Management consulting firms of the United States
American companies established in 1972
Consulting firms established in 1972
Private detectives and investigators
Security companies of the United States
Companies based in Manhattan
Private intelligence agencies